"No Love at All" is a song written by Johnny Christopher and Wayne C. Thompson. It was recorded by American country music artist Lynn Anderson and released as a single in June 1970 via Columbia Records.

Background and release 
"No Love at All" was recorded at the Columbia Studio in April 1970, located in Nashville, Tennessee. The sessions was produced by Glenn Sutton, Anderson's longtime producer at the Columbia label as well as first husband.

"No Love at All" reached number 15 on the Billboard Hot Country Singles chart in 1970. It was Anderson's eleventh major hit single as a recording artist. It also became a minor hit on the Canadian RPM Country Songs chart, reaching number 42 in 1970. The song was issued on Anderson's 1970 studio album, No Love at All.

Track listings 
7" vinyl single
 "No Love at All" – 2:48
 "I Found You Just in Time" – 2:03

Cover versions 
 B. J. Thomas covered "No Love at All" in the winter of 1971. His version became a pop hit in the United States and Canada, reaching number 16 in both countries. The song did better on the Easy Listening charts, reaching number 4 in the U.S.

 Bobbi Martin also covered the song in 1971, reaching number 123 on the U.S. Billboard chart.

Chart performance 
Lynn Anderson

B.J. Thomas

Bobbi Martin

References 

1970 songs
1971 singles
Columbia Records singles
Scepter Records singles
Buddah Records singles
Lynn Anderson songs
B. J. Thomas songs
Songs written by Johnny Christopher